In the Quran, parables are used extensively, in a variety of forms and covering many themes. According to Afnan Fatani a contemporary scholar it is not the instructive stories but rather the cognitive role they play to illustrate abstract religion and to make the unfamiliar appear familiar that makes them important.  They are meant to teach moral lessons, and usually the figures involved are of little importance as more attention is paid to the lesson than the figure. Below are some examples of parables in the Qur'an:

In verse 18:45, for example, worldly life is compared to the fall of rain and the cycle of vegetation:
"And strike for them a parable of the worldly life: it is like the water which we send down from the sky, and then the plants of the earth mingle with it. But then they become dry and broken and are scattered by the winds. And God is capable of all things."

Other examples are the parable of the Two Gardens in chapter 18:32-44, the Hamlet in Ruins in chapter 2:259. and Parable of the House of Spider in chapter 29:41

See also
 Parable of those who Associate Partners with God
 Parables of Jesus

References